Sempu may refer to:
 Sempu (island), an island
 Mount Sempu, a volcano